The Anthem of Free Russia (Gimn Svobodnoy Rossii) was a proposed anthem of the Russian Republic after the February Revolution. The music was composed by Russian composer Alexander Gretchaninov and the lyrics were written by Constantine Balmont. However, unlike Worker's Marseillaise, the Hymn of Free Russia was not adopted by the Russian Provisional Government of 1917 nor was approved during several special meetings of artists.

Development
When Gretchaninov found out the music of the song was finalized along with unfinished lyrics, he became dissatisfied with the lyrics, so he contacted Balmont. After Gretchaninov contacted Balmont, the lyrics were complete. The anthem was eventually published and was first performed at Bolshoi Theatre, directed by Emil Cooper. Originally, the plot was taken from "My Life" (Моя жизнь), a book written by Gretchaninov. It was published in New York in 1954.

After Gretchaninov's arrival in the United States, his friend Kurt Schindler and his wife translated the text into English, which was published by G. Schirmer, Inc.

Historical significance 
The song was widely popular between February and the Bolshevik Revolution in November. According to the historians Boris Kolonitskii and Orlando Figes, songs were an important form of revolutionary expression:“Singing was the signal for a demonstration. It gave the protesters a sense of purpose and confidence and, perhaps most importantly, lifted their spirits. The leaders of the singing were the focus of the crowd in the February Days. The sound of the crowd drew other people on to the streets and hence into 'the revolution'. By joining in with the singing, spectators turned into participants in a matter of moments. Songs united the demonstrators, giving cohesion and a collective identity to diverse groups and classes.”

Popularity
Shortly after the release of Radio Liberty on air, a musical screen saver was needed, through which listeners could listen to Russian broadcasts better. The Hymn of Free Russia was then chosen.

The song became the unofficial anthem of the Russian opposition. During the 2022 invasion of Ukraine, it also became a popular anti-war symbol. 

As radio veteran Gene Sosin recalled in the book "Sparks of Freedom", the anthem began with the line "Long live Russia, a free country!" and the music was performed on a celestial, although the tempo and instrumentation was later changed to an orchestra. For 38 consecutive years, millions of listeners in the Soviet Union actively heard the tune, regardless of the song's origin. The song was well-known to be "connected with a 'free voice' from the outside world." This made people forget about their cold pasts.

Lyrics

1926 version

References

External links

Historical national anthems
Russian anthems
Regional songs